The Russian Steam Navigation and Trading Company ( or ROPiT , also referred as Russian S.N.Co.) of Odessa was one of the biggest joint stock steamship companies in Imperial Russia. It was established in 1856 and ceased to exist in 1918 due to nationalization after the revolution in Russia.

In 1858 the company obtained a 24-year contract for usage of the port of Villafranca Marittima, on the Mediterranean with the Kingdom of Sardinia.

From 1863 to 1914 all Russian post offices in the Ottoman Empire were run by the ROPiT.

In 1901 it had a fleet of 72 steamships. Company stock was listed on Saint-Petersburg Stock Exchange.

ROPiT fleet 
Svet (Свет) (1815) 
Emperor Aleksander II (Император Александр II) (1858) 
Veliki Knjaz Konstantin (Великий Князь Константин) (1858) 
Oleg (Олег) (1859) 
Lasar (Лазар) (1863) 
Rostov (Ростов) (1867) 
Imperatriza Maria (Императрица Мария) (1877) 
 (Аскольд) (1879, since 1886 till 1916)
Chuanpu (Хуанпу) (1882) 
Tsar (Царь) (1883) 
Metschta (Мечта) (1884) 
Luch (Луч) (1886) 
Odessa (Одесса) (1889) 
Veliki Knjaz Aleksei (Великий Князь Алексей) (1890) 
Blesk (Блеск) (1890) 
Veliki Knjaz Konstantin (Великий Князь Константин) (II) (1890) 
Veliki Knjaz Konstantin (Великий Князь Константин) (III) (1890) 
Svyatoi Nikolai (Святой Николай) (1893) 
Korolyevna Olga (Королева Ольга) (1893) 
Emperor Nikolai II (Император Николай II) 
Chtyr Dag (Чатыр Даг) (1896) 
Diana (Диана) (1899) 
Chikhachev (Чихачёв) 
Alton (Алтон) (1901) 
Meteor (Метеор) (1901) 
Chersonese (Херсонес) (1903) 
Ewrat (Евфрат) (1906) called EUPHRATE in FRANCE (based in Marseille after the beginning of the revolution (bolchevique).
Prince Yevgenia Oldenburgskaya (Принцесса Евгения Ольденбургская) (1903) 
Emperor Nikolai I (Император Николай I) (1913) 
Imperatriza Yekaterine II (Императрица Екатерина II) 
Emperor Aleksander III (Император Александр III) 
Emperor Pyotr Veliki (Император Пётр Великий) 
Tsar Mikhail Fyodorovich (Царь Михаил Фёдорович) (1914) 
Tsarevich Aleksey Nikolayevich (Цесаревич Алексей Николаевич) (1914)

Passenger lines 
The company also offered passenger rides.  For example, weekly services on the routes "Constantinople-Smyrna-Piraeus-Alexandria, Constantinople-Odessa" - every fortnight the Bulgarian ports of Burgas and Varna were also called in - and "Constantinople–Sevastopol".  By 1914 the ROPiT  operated a direct line from Odessa via Constantinople to Alexandria and a round trip line and a "Macedonian line" there.  Also Black Sea cruises were offered.  So changed weekly the "Bulgarian-Anatolian line" from Odessa to Burgas, Constantinople and Trebizond to Batum and the "Anatolian Line" from Constantinople to Batum.

See also
 Black Sea Shipping Company

References 

Transport companies established in 1856
Defunct shipping companies of Russia
Companies based in Odesa
Transport companies disestablished in 1918